Rain is a single by the Australian post-punk band Man in the Wood and one of only two releases under that name before the change to Tlot Tlot in 1991.

Unlike other Man in the Wood and Tlot Tlot releases, this single was not released on any label, however the catalogue number MAN 001 can be seen in the runout groove. On this release, drummer Stanley Paulzen is credited by his middle name of Jason.

Track list 
Both songs written and composed by Bolwell/Paulzen.
 Rain (3:23)
 Glamour and the Sand (2:52)

Segments of the track "Glamour and the Sand" were later used as an intro and outro to the EP Thumper, renamed "Samurai Glands".

Crew 
 Owen Bolwell - bass, lead vocals, artwork
 Andrew Briant - guitar
 Stanley Paulzen - drums, backing vocals

External links 
 "Rain" at Discogs

1989 singles
Tlot Tlot songs
1988 songs